Lead climbing competitions at the 2017 IFSC Climbing World Cup were held at eight stops. The winners were awarded trophies, and the best three finishers received medals. At the end of the season an overall ranking was determined based upon points, which athletes were awarded for finishing in the top 30 of each individual event. Romain Desgranges won the men's seasonal title, Janja Garnbret won the women's seasonal title, and Slovenia won the national team title.

Overall Ranking 
An overall ranking was determined based upon points, which athletes were awarded for finishing in the top 30 of each individual event.

Men 
7 best competition results were counted (not counting points in brackets) for IFSC Climbing Worldcup 2017. Romain Desgranges won.

Women 
7 best competition results were counted (not counting points in brackets) for IFSC Climbing Worldcup 2017. Janja Garnbret won.

National Teams 
For National Team Ranking, 3 best results per competition and category were counted (not counting results in brackets). Slovenia won.

Villars, Switzerland (7-8 July)

Men 
77 athletes attended the World Cup in Villars.

Women 
58 athletes attended the World Cup in Villars.

Chamonix, France (12-13 July)

Men 
83 athletes attended the World Cup in Chamonix.

Women 
63 athletes attended the World Cup in Chamonix.

Briançon, France (28-29 July)

Men 
68 athletes attended the World Cup in Briançon.

Women 
58 athletes attended the World Cup in Briançon.

Arco, Italy (25-26 August)

Men 
85 athletes attended the World Cup in Arco.

Women 
72 athletes attended the World Cup in Arco.

Edinburgh, United Kingdom (23-24 September)

Men 
55 athletes attended the World Cup in Edinburgh.

Women 
38 athletes attended the World Cup in Edinburgh.

Wujiang, China (7-8 October)

Men 
36 athletes attended the World Cup in Wujiang.

Women 
30 athletes attended the World Cup in Wujiang.

Xiamen, China (14-15 October)

Men 
37 athletes attended the World Cup in Xiamen.

Women 
26 athletes attended the World Cup in Xiamen.

Kranj, Slovenia (11-12 November)

Men 
61 athletes attended the World Cup in Kranj.

Women 
52 athletes attended the World Cup in Kranj.

References 

IFSC Climbing World Cup
2017 in sport climbing